USS Chincoteague (AVP-24) was a United States Navy seaplane tender in commission from 1943 to 1946 that saw service in the Pacific during World War II. After the war, she was in commission in the United States Coast Guard as the cutter USCGC Chincoteague (WAVP-375), later WHEC-375, from 1949 to 1972. She was transferred to South Vietnam in 1972 and was commissioned into service with the Republic of Vietnam Navy as the frigate RVNS Lý Thường Kiệt (HQ-16), seeing combat in the Battle of the Paracel Islands in 1974. When South Vietnam collapsed at the conclusion of the Vietnam War in 1975, she fled to the Philippines, where she was commissioned into the Philippine Navy, serving as the frigate RPS (later BRP)  Andrés Bonifacio (PF-7) from 1976 to 1985.

Construction and commissioning

Chincoteague was launched on 15 April 1942 by Lake Washington Shipyard at Houghton, Washington, sponsored by Mrs. Doris Winden Rowe. She was commissioned on 12 April 1943.

United States Navy service

World War II

New Guinea campaign

Chincoteague departed San Diego, California, on 13 June 1943 for Saboe Bay in the Santa Cruz Islands, where she arrived on 6 July 1943 to support the New Guinea campaign as tender for Fleet Air Wing 1 (FAW-1). On 16 July 1943 the Japanese launched eight air attacks at Saboe Bay, killing nine of Chincoteagues crew and damaging the ship badly with one direct bomb hit and two near misses. Taken in tow first by the seaplane tender  and then by the tug , Chincoteague reached Espiritu Santo on 21 July 1943 for emergency repairs, and later was towed to San Francisco, California, for a thorough overhaul.

Central and Southwest Pacific operations

After completion of repairs, Chincoteague put out from San Diego on 27 January 1944 for Pearl Harbor, Hawaii, and operations in support of the consolidation of the northern Solomon Islands, the occupation of the Marshall Islands, and air action in the Treasury Islands. She tended seaplanes at Kwajalein, at Eniwetok, in the Treasury Islands, and at Green Island. In addition, she carried freight, mail, and passengers among the Solomon Islands, Marshall Islands, Gilbert Islands, Mariana Islands, New Hebrides, and Phoenix Islands, and voyaged from Guadalcanal to Auckland, New Zealand, returning with aircraft engines. Escorting a convoy, Chincoteague sailed from Eniwetok on 24 September 1944 for Pearl Harbor and an overhaul. She returned to active operations on 6 December 1944 at Kossol Roads in the Palau Islands, where she conducted salvage and rescue operations for the next two months.

Iwo Jima campaign and operations at Ulithi Atoll

Chincoteague arrived at Guam on 13 February 1945 to join the assault force bound for Iwo Jima, and on 20 February 1945, arrived off the bitterly contested island to tend seaplanes until 8 March 1945. Similar operations at Ulithi Atoll followed until 8 June 1945, when she sailed for an overhaul on the United States West Coast, where she was when World War II ended with the cessation of hostilities with Japan on 15 August 1945.

Honors and awards

Chincoteague received six battle stars for World War II service.

Post-World War II

On postwar occupation duty, Chincoteague sailed to the East Asia to care for seaplanes at Okinawa and Tsingtao, China, between 18 October 1945 and 16 March 1946. She then sailed for San Diego; New Orleans, Louisiana; and Beaumont, Texas.

Decommissioning

On 21 December 1946, Chincoteague was decommissioned and placed in reserve.

United States Coast Guard service

 Barnegat-class ships were very reliable and seaworthy and had good habitability, and the Coast Guard viewed them as ideal for ocean station duty, in which they would perform weather reporting and search and rescue tasks, once they were modified by having a balloon shelter added aft and having oceanographic equipment, an oceanographic winch, and a hydrographic winch installed. After World War II, the U.S. Navy transferred 18 of the ships to the Coast Guard, in which they were known as the Casco-class cutters.

The Navy loaned Chincoteague to the United States Coast Guard on 7 March 1949. The Coast Guard commissioned her as USCGC Chincoteague (WAVP-375) the same day.

Service history
Chincoteague was home-ported in Norfolk, Virginia, throughout her Coast Guard career. Her primary duty was to serve on ocean stations in the North Atlantic Ocean to gather meteorological data. While on duty in one of these stations, she was required to patrol a 210-square-mile (544-square-kilometer) area for three weeks at a time, leaving the area only when physically relieved by another Coast Guard cutter or in the case of a dire emergency. While on station, she acted as an aircraft check point at the point of no return, a relay point for messages from ships and aircraft, as a source of the latest weather information for passing aircraft, as a floating oceanographic laboratory, and as a search-and-rescue ship for downed aircraft and vessels in distress, and she engaged in law enforcement operations.

In December 1955, Chincoteague took the disabled merchant ship Canadian Observer under tow to keep her from going aground off the south coast of Newfoundland in Canada.

On 30 October 1956, Chincoteague rescued 33 crewmen from the West German merchant ship Helga Bolten in the North Atlantic by using two inflatable lifeboats during heavy seas. She then stood by distressed vessels for seven days until they could be towed to the Azores by commercial tug.

On 1 May 1966, Chincoteague was reclassified as a high endurance cutter and redesignated WHEC-375. On 26 September 1966 her long-term loan from the Navy to the Coast Guard came to an end when the Navy transferred her outright to the Coast Guard.

Decommissioning and transfer to South Vietnam

They were originally scheduled to sail to Subic Bay in the Philippine Islands, but were diverted to the U.S. Navy base at Apra Harbor, Guam. Eventually the three cutters had their antisubmarine warfare equipment removed and were decommissioned, transferred to the U.S. Navy, and then transferred to South Vietnam. For Chincoteague, all three of these events occurred on 21 June 1972.

Republic of Vietnam Navy service
After Chincoteague was transferred to South Vietnam, she was commissioned in the Republic of Vietnam Navy as the frigate RVNS Lý Thường Kiệt. (HQ-16) She was among seven Barnegat- and Casco-class ships transferred to South Vietnam in 1971 and 1972. Known in the Republic of Vietnam Navy as the s, they were the largest warships in the South Vietnamese inventory, and their 5-inch (127-millimeter) guns were South Vietnam's largest naval guns.

Service history
Lý Thường Kiệt and her sisters fought alongside U.S. Navy ships during the final years of the Vietnam War, patrolling the South Vietnamese coast and providing gunfire support to South Vietnamese forces ashore.

The Battle of the Paracel Islands

Possession of the Paracel Islands had long been disputed between South Vietnam and the People's Republic of China. With South Vietnamese forces stationed on the islands drawing down because they were needed on the Vietnamese mainland in the war with North Vietnam, China took advantage of the situation to send forces to seize the islands.

On 16 January 1974, Lý Thường Kiệt spotted Chinese forces ashore on the islands. She and the Chinese ordered one another to withdraw, and neither side did. Reinforcements arrived for both sides over the next three days, including Lý Thường Kiệts sister ship , which appeared on the scene on 18 January 1974 with the commander of the Republic of Vietnam Navy, Captain Hà Văn Ngạc, aboard.

By the morning of 19 January 1974, the Chinese had four corvettes and two submarine chasers at the Paracels, while the South Vietnamese had Lý Thường Kiệt, Trần Bình Trọng, the frigate , and the corvette  on the scene. Trần Bình Trọng landed South Vietnamese troops on Duncan Island (or Quang Hoa in Vietnamese), and they were driven off by Chinese gunfire. The South Vietnamese ships opened fire on the Chinese ships at 10:24 hours, and the 40-minute Battle of the Paracel Islands ensued. Nhật Tảo was sunk, and the other three South Vietnamese ships all suffered damage, Lý Thường Kiệt being one of the most heavily damaged ships; Chinese losses were more difficult to ascertain, but certainly most or all of the Chinese ships suffered damage and one or two may have sunk. Not equipped or trained for open-ocean combat and outgunned, the South Vietnamese ships were forced to withdraw.

The Chinese seized the islands the next day, and they have remained under the control of the People's Republic of China ever since.

Flight to the Philippines
When South Vietnam collapsed at the end of the Vietnam War in late April 1975, Lý Thường Kiệt became a ship without a country. She fled to Subic Bay in the Philippines, packed with South Vietnamese refugees. On 22 and 23 May 1975, a U.S. Coast Guard team inspected Lý Thường Kiệt and five of her sister ships, which also had fled to the Philippines in April 1975. One of the inspectors noted: "These vessels brought in several hundred refugees and are generally rat-infested. They are in a filthy, deplorable condition. Below decks generally would compare with a garbage scow."

After Lý Thường Kiệt had been cleaned and repaired, the United States formally transferred her to the Philippines on 5 April 1976.

Philippine Navy service
The former Lý Thường Kiệt was commissioned into the Philippine Navy as the frigate RPS Andrés Bonifacio (PF-7). In June 1980 her prefix was changed from "RPS" to "BRP", and was renamed BRP Andrés Bonifacio (PF-7). She and three other former Barnegat- and Casco-class ships were the largest Philippine Navy ships of their time and were known in the Philippine Navy as the s.

Modernization

The Andrés Bonifacio-class frigates were passed to the Philippine Navy with fewer weapons aboard than they had had during their U.S. Navy and U.S. Coast guard careers and with old surface search radars installed. The Philippine Navy addressed these shortfalls through modernization programs. In Philippine service, Andrés Bonifacio retained her South Vietnamese armament, consisting of a single Mark 12 5"/38 caliber (127-mm) gun, a dual-purpose weapon capable of anti-surface and anti-air fire, mounted in a Mark 30 Mod 0 enclosed base ring with a range of up to  yards; two twin Mark 1 Bofors 40mm anti-aircraft gun mounts, four Mk. 4 single 20-millimeter Oerlikon anti-aircraft gun mounts, four M2 Browning .50-caliber (12.7-millimeter) general-purpose machine guns, and two 81-mm mortars. However, in 1979 Hatch and Kirk, Inc., added a helicopter deck aft which could accommodate a Philippine Navy MBB Bo 105C helicopter for utility, scouting, and maritime patrol purposes, although the ship had no capability to refuel or otherwise support visiting helicopters. The Sperry SPS-53 surface search and navigation radar also was installed, replacing the AN/SPS-23 radar, although the ship retained both its AN/SPS-29D air search radar and its Mark 26 Mod 1 Fire Control Radar System. The Philippine Navy made plans to equip Andrés Bonifacio and her sister ships with new radar systems and long-range BGM-84 Harpoon anti-ship cruise missiles, but this upgrade did not materialize due to the worsening political and economic crisis in the Philippines in the mid-1980s.

Service history

After nine years of active service, Andrés Bonifacio reportedly was decommissioned in June 1985, although she was still listed as "active" as of July 1993. She became well known as the ship in which renegade Colonel Gregorio "Gringo" Honasan, leader of a nearly successful coup against the Corazon Aquino government, was detained after his capture in December 1987. Together with his 13-man guard escort, he escaped on 2 April 1988.

The Philippine Navy made plans to reactivate Andrés Bonifacio as an auxiliary fleet flagship in 1995, but this never took place due to a lack of funds. She eventually sank at her berthing area in Fort San Felipe, part of the Sangley Point Naval Base at Cavite City on Luzon.

Disposal
Andrés Bonifacio was refloated and ultimately sold for scrapping in 2003. Her hulk's sale helped the Philippine Navy to finance an upgrade program for its three Jacinto class corvettes.

Notes

References

 
 NavSource Online: Service Ship Photo Archive USS Chincoteague (AVP-24) USCGC Chincoteague (WAVP-375) (WHEC-375)
 Department of the Navy Naval Historical Center Online Library of Selected Images: U.S. Navy Ships: USS Chincoteague (AVP-24), 1943–1949
 United States Coast Guard Historians Office: Chincoteague, 1949 WHEC-375 Radio call sign: NBOZ
United States Coast Guard Historian's Office: Mackinac, 1949 WHEC-371
United States Coast Guard Historian's Office: McCulloch, 1946 WAVP / WHEC-386
 The Inventory of VNN Battle Ships 
 The Inventory of VNNs Battle Ships Part 2 
 Philippine Navy Official website
 Philippine Fleet Official Website
 Philippine Defense Forum
 Hazegray World Navies Today: Philippines
 Naming and Code Designation of PN Ships 
 Chesneau, Roger. Conways All the World's Fighting Ships 1922–1946. New York: Mayflower Books, Inc., 1980. .
Moore, John E., Captain, RN, FRGS. Janes Fighting Ships 1973–1974. London: Janes Yearbooks, 1973.
Gardiner, Robert. Conway's All the Worlds Fighting Ships 1947–1982, Part I: The Western Powers. Annapolis, Maryland: Naval Institute Press, 1983. .
 Gray, Randal, Ed. Conways All the Worlds Fighting Ships 1947–1982 Part II: The Warsaw Pact and Non-Aligned Nations. Annapolis, Maryland: Naval Institute Press, 1983. .
 Moore, John, Captain, RN, FRGS, Ed. Janes Fighting Ships 1973–1974. London: Janes Yearbooks, 1973. No ISBN number.
 Moore, John, Captain, RN, Ed. Janes Fighting Ships 1980–81. New York: Janes Publishing Inc., 1980. .

\

World War II auxiliary ships of the United States
Barnegat-class seaplane tenders
Seaplane tenders of the United States Navy
Ships transferred from the United States Navy to the Republic of Vietnam Navy
Ships transferred from the United States Navy to the Philippine Navy
1942 ships
Ships transferred from the United States Navy to the United States Coast Guard
Ships of the United States Coast Guard
Casco-class cutters
Ships built at Lake Washington Shipyard
Weather ships
Trần Quang Khải-class frigates
Vietnam War frigates of South Vietnam
Ships of the Philippine Navy